Miles Stewart (born 4 May 1971 in Sydney, Manly) is an athlete from Australia, who competes in triathlon.

Originally a speedskater from Wollongong he rose to the elite ranks of the emerging sport of triathlon in the early 1990s whilst living on Queensland's Gold Coast.

Palmarès
 3 time (consecutive) winner of the Hervey Bay Triathlon.
 He won the silver medal at the 2002 Commonwealth Games in Manchester.
 Stewart competed at the first Olympic triathlon at the 2000 Summer Olympics.  He took sixth place with a total time of 1:49:14.52.
 Currently CEO of Triathlon Australia
Stewart can be found in the Guinness Book of World Records for the fastest triathlon time in the world.

References

External links

1971 births
Living people
Australian male triathletes
Olympic triathletes of Australia
Triathletes at the 2000 Summer Olympics
Sportspeople from Sydney
Commonwealth Games silver medallists for Australia
Triathletes at the 2002 Commonwealth Games
Commonwealth Games medallists in triathlon
20th-century Australian people
21st-century Australian people
Sportsmen from New South Wales
Medallists at the 2002 Commonwealth Games